Maharajpur Assembly constituency is one of 403 legislative assembly seats of the Uttar Pradesh. It is part of the Akbarpur Lok Sabha constituency. Since 2008, this assembly constituency is numbered 217 amongst 403 constituencies.

Maharajpur comprises KCs 2-Maharajpur, 3-Narwal, Chakeri (CT), Ward Nos. 9, 24, 31, 35, 38, 40, 41, 53, and 77 in Kanpur Municipal Corporation of 2-Kanpur Sadar Tehsil.

In 2022 Uttar Pradesh Legislative Assembly election, BJP candidate Satish Mahana won the elections by defeating Samajwadi Party candidate Fateh Bahadur Singh Gill by the margin of 82,261 votes. Currently he is serving as the Speaker of the Legislative Assembly.

Member of Legislative Assembly

Election results

2022

2017

2012

See also
 List of Vidhan Sabha constituencies of Uttar Pradesh
 Uttar Pradesh Legislature
 Uttar Pradesh Legislative Assembly

References

External links
 

Politics of Kanpur
Assembly constituencies of Uttar Pradesh